Claude Mouriéras (born 27 September 1953) is a French film director and screenwriter. He has directed nine films since 1989. His film Dis-moi que je rêve was screened in the Un Certain Regard section at the 1998 Cannes Film Festival.

Filmography
 Montalvo et l'enfant (1989)
 L'écrivain, le peintre, le funambule (1990)
 Paroles d'acteurs de la Comédie-Française (1993)
 Sale gosse (1995)
 Dis-moi que je rêve (1998)
 Tout va bien, on s'en va (2000)
 Le prêt, la poule et l'oeuf (2002)
 Le voyage des femmes de Zartalé (2005)
 Kady, la belle vie (2008)

References

External links

1953 births
Living people
French film directors
French male screenwriters
French screenwriters